Lorenzo Machado (born 1 February 1998) is a South African cricketer. He made his first-class debut on 1 April 2018 for Cardiff MCCU against Gloucestershire as part of the Marylebone Cricket Club University fixtures.

References

External links
 

1998 births
Living people
South African cricketers
Cardiff MCCU cricketers